Choi Yeong-gi (최영기; 19 December 1925 – 20 October 2004) was a South Korean athlete. He competed in the men's triple jump at the 1952 Summer Olympics and the 1956 Summer Olympics.

References

1925 births
2004 deaths
Athletes (track and field) at the 1952 Summer Olympics
Athletes (track and field) at the 1956 Summer Olympics
South Korean male triple jumpers
Olympic athletes of South Korea
Place of birth missing
Asian Games medalists in athletics (track and field)
Asian Games bronze medalists for South Korea
Athletes (track and field) at the 1954 Asian Games
Medalists at the 1954 Asian Games
20th-century South Korean people